Priolo (foaled March 17, 1987 in the United States) was a French Thoroughbred racehorse. He was bred and raced by Chryss Goulandris' Ecurie Skymarc Farm. In 1990 he won two Group One races and ran second to Saumarez in the Grand Prix de Paris. Sent to Belmont Park in the United States, he was third behind winner Royal Academy and runnerup, Itsallgreektome in the 1990 Breeders' Cup Mile.

In 1991, Priolo won his third Group One event, capturing the Prix du Moulin de Longchamp.

Retired from racing, in December 1991, Priolo was sent to stand at stud in Ireland. The best of his progeny included Sendawar, Priory Belle,  Mirio (Grand Prix de Saint-Cloud), Brilliance (Prix Saint-Alary) and Tigertail (Prix Minerve).

References

 Priolo's pedigree and partial racing stats

1987 racehorse births
2014 racehorse deaths
Racehorses bred in Kentucky
Racehorses trained in France
Thoroughbred family 5-f